Cassandra Poudrier (born December 5, 1992) is an ice hockey player who currently plays in the CWHL for Les Canadiennes de Montreal. On October 3, 2011, she was named to the Team Canada roster that will participate in the 2011 4 Nations Cup.

Playing career

Hockey Canada
In April 2010, Poudrier competed for Canada at the Under-18 World Championship, as the Canadian team won the Gold Medal. As a member of the gold medal winning squad, a hockey card of her was featured in the Upper Deck 2010 World of Sports card series.

She was a member of Canada's National Women's Development Team that won a gold medal at the 2015 Nations Cup (formerly known as the Meco Cup). In the gold medal game of the 2015 Nations Cup, she would log an assist in a 4-0 win against Sweden.

NCAA
In January 2012, it was announced that Poudrier committed to joining the Cornell Big Red in autumn 2012. She was the top-scoring freshman defenseman in her first season and was named to the ECAC Hockey All Rookie Team. She earned Ivy League Honorable Mention and Third Team All-ECAC Hockey honors as a sophomore and was named to the ECAC Hockey All-Tournament Team as a junior. During her senior season, while serving as team captain, she was named a Second Team All-Ivy Selection. She was selected for membership in the Quill and Dagger society.

Professional
Poudrier was drafted by the Connecticut Whale of the Premier Hockey Federation 18th overall in the 5th round of the 2015 draft. In the 2016 Canadian Women's Hockey League draft she was taken 10th overall by the Montreal Les Canadiennes. Poudrier has since started her professional career with Les Canadiennes, choosing to play in the CWHL.

Career stats

Hockey Canada

References

External links
 
 Cassandra Poudrier at Cornell University
 

1992 births
Living people
Ice hockey people from Quebec
People from Terrebonne, Quebec
Canadian women's ice hockey defencemen
Cornell Big Red women's ice hockey players
Les Canadiennes de Montreal players
Clarkson Cup champions